The House of Gairis a 1953 thriller novel by the British writer Eric Linklater. During a storm a young writer stops at a lonely house in the Scottish Highlands and encounter's its strange owner.

The following year it was adapted as an episode of the American TV series Studio One featuring Basil Rathbone, Cora Witherspoon and Hurd Hatfield.

References

Bibliography
 Hart, Francis Russell.  The Scottish Novel: From Smollett to Spark. Harvard University Press, 1978.

1953 British novels
Novels by Eric Linklater
Novels set in Scotland
British thriller novels
Jonathan Cape books